Adriano Grimaldi (born 5 April 1991) is a German professional footballer who plays as a forward for 1. FC Saarbrücken.

Club career
Grimaldi started his career at FC Sachsen Leipzig in 2009, where he scored twice in 12 matches.

Grimaldi signed for 1. FSV Mainz 05 ahead of the 2009-10 season, but only made six appearances with the senior team. However, he made many appearances for the second team, and scored 11 goals in 43 appearances.

On 19 May 2011, he signed a two-year contract with Fortuna Düsseldorf. Grimaldi split time between the first team and the second team, and made nine appearances in all competitions with the first team, scoring once in the league.

Grimaldi joined SV Sandhausen on loan for the conclusion of the 2011–12 3. Liga, and he made 10 appearances for Sandhausen as they won the league.

Ahead of the 2012–13 3. Liga season, Grimaldi joined VfL Osnabrück. Across two seasons, he scored 13 goals across 60 matches in all competitions, including 11 in the 2013–14 season.

On 13 May 2014, he signed a three-year contract with FC Heidenheim.

In 2016, Grimaldi signed a two-year contract with 3. Liga team SC Preußen Münster. He scored 30 goals in 71 league appearances, and also made six appearances in various cup competitions.

After playing one season with TSV 1860 Munich, Grimaldi joined KFC Uerdingen 05.

On 25 May 2021, Grimaldi signed a two-year contract with 1. FC Saarbrücken.

International career
Born in Germany, Grimaldi is of Italian descent. He is a youth international for Germany.

Honours
SV Sandhausen
 3. Liga: 2011–12

VfL Osnabrück
 3. Liga third place: 2012–13

References

External links

1991 births
Living people
Sportspeople from Göttingen
German sportspeople of Italian descent
German footballers
Association football forwards
Bundesliga players
2. Bundesliga players
3. Liga players
FC Sachsen Leipzig players
1. FSV Mainz 05 II players
1. FSV Mainz 05 players
Fortuna Düsseldorf players
SV Sandhausen players
VfL Osnabrück players
1. FC Heidenheim players
SC Preußen Münster players
TSV 1860 Munich players
KFC Uerdingen 05 players
1. FC Saarbrücken players